St Kilda is a former New Zealand parliamentary electorate. It existed from 1946 to 1996 and was represented by four Members of Parliament.

Population centres
The 1941 New Zealand census had been postponed due to World War II, so the 1946 electoral redistribution had to take ten years of population growth and movements into account. The North Island gained a further two electorates from the South Island due to faster population growth. The abolition of the country quota through the Electoral Amendment Act, 1945 reduced the number and increased the size of rural electorates. None of the existing electorates remained unchanged, 27 electorates were abolished, eight former electorates were re-established, and 19 electorates were created for the first time, including St Kilda. The original electorate covered the southern part of Otago Peninsula and some of the settlements that form the suburb of South Dunedin, including St Kilda. It thus took up most of the area that previously belonged to the  electorate (which in itself took over most of the area that previously belonged to the  electorate), and some area that had belonged to the  electorate (which was abolished).

The southern part of Otago Peninsula has always belonged to the St Kilda electorate until the 1987 electoral redistribution, and the various electoral redistributions determined how much of the suburb of South Dunedin belonged to the electorate.

History
The electorate was created in 1946, and was abolished in 1996 (the first election using the mixed-member proportional representation (MMP) system), when it was absorbed into the  electorate.

The first representative was Fred Jones. He previously represented the Dunedin South electorate and retired at the end of two parliamentary terms of representing St Kilda in 1951.

Members of Parliament
Key

Election results

1993 election

1990 election

1987 election

1984 election

1981 election

1978 election

1975 election

1972 election

1969 election

1966 election

1963 election

1960 election

1957 election

1954 election

1951 election

1949 election

1946 election

Notes

References

Historical electorates of New Zealand
Politics of Dunedin
1946 establishments in New Zealand
1996 disestablishments in New Zealand